Severus is the name of various historical and fictional figures, including:

Emperors of the Roman empire
Septimius Severus (145–211), Roman emperor from 193 to 211 (rarely known as Severus I.)
Severus Caracalla (188–217), Roman emperor from 198 to 217
Severus Alexander (208–235), Roman emperor from 222 to 235
Valerius Severus, Roman emperor in the tetrarchy from 306 to 307 (rarely known as Severus II.)
Libius Severus, Roman emperor from 461 to 465 (rarely known as Severus III.)

Other individuals
Quintus Varius Severus, Roman politician from the late Republic
Aulus Caecina Severus, Roman general and politician
Claudius Severus, leader of the Helvetii in 69
Cornelius Severus, Roman epic poet in Augustan age
Sextus Julius Severus, 2nd-century Roman general
Severus (Encratite), founder of the gnostic sect Severian Encratites
Gaius Claudius Severus, Roman senator and consul in 112
Gnaeus Claudius Severus Arabianus, Roman philosopher, senator and consul in 146, son of Gaius Claudius Severus
Gnaeus Claudius Severus, Roman philosopher, senator and consul in 167 and 173, son of Arabianus
Gaius Septimius Severus Aper, Roman Aristocrat
Tiberius Claudius Severus Proculus, Roman senator and consul in 200
Marcus Julius Philippus Severus Augustus (238–249), Roman co-emperor (247–249) with his father Philip the Arab
Severus of Barcelona (died c. 304), a legendary Bishop of Barcelona
Severus of Ravenna (c. 308–c. 348), bishop of Ravenna
Sulpicius Severus (c. 363–c. 425), a Christian writer and native of Aquitania in modern-day France
Severus of Reims, bishop of Reims from 394 to 400
Severus of Naples (died 409), a bishop of Naples during the 4th and 5th centuries
Severus, the first known Bishop of Vence in 439 and perhaps as early as 419
Severus of Vienne (died c. 455), a missionary in France
Severus of Antioch or Saint Severus the Great (465–518), a Greek monk and theologian, and Patriarch of Antioch
Severus of Menorca, 5th-century AD Christian bishop of Menorca
Severus II bar Masqeh (died 681), Patriarch of Antioch
Severus of Avranches (died c. 690), a French peasant who became Bishop of Avranches
Severus Ibn al-Muqaffaʿ (died 987), Coptic bishop and historian

Fictional characters
Severus Snape, character in the Harry Potter series by J. K. Rowling
Captain Severus, character in Ultramarines: A Warhammer 40,000 Movie

See also
 Severo (disambiguation), Italian and Spanish derivative
 Sawiris (disambiguation), Egyptian/Arabic derivative